This is a list of prefects of Brod-Posavina County.

Prefects of Brod-Posavina County (1993–present)

See also
Brod-Posavina County

Notes

External links
World Statesmen - Brod-Posavina County

Brod-Posavina County